JFO may refer to:
 Joint Fires Observer, in the U.S. military
 Joint Forces Operation, the Ukrainian military counter-offensive in the War in Donbas
 Journal of Field Ornithology, a periodical
 Crissy Field, former U.S. Army airfield in San Francisco
 J. F. Oberlin, noted pastor and namesake of Oberlin College